Suðurey is an island in the Vestmann Islands, south of Iceland.

Vestmannaeyjar